Armin Sohrabian (born 26 July 1995) is an Iranian footballer of Armenian descent who plays for Iranian club Gol Gohar Sirjan as a Left-Back

Club career

Sepahan 
Armin Sohrabian is a product of Sepahan Club Academy. He started playing football for the Sepahan youth team in 2011 and in 2014 he joined the senior team. He won the 2014-2014 Premier League with Sepahan.

Esteghlal 

He joined Esteghlal Tehran on Wednesday, July 28, 2017 with a two-year contract. After a few weeks on the bench, he played his first game for Esteghlal against South Pars Jam in his specialized position of left defender in the 2017-2017 season.

In the match between Esteghlal and Foolad Khuzestan, in a clash between him and Padvani, the defender of Esteghlal, he was injured. Sohrabian was placed in the middle of the defense in the same match. The title of central defender went to the field

Armin Sohrabian won the Iranian Football Cup 97-96 in his first year in Esteghlal

The peak of Sohrabian's brilliance was in the match between Esteghlal and Zobahan in the Asian Champions League. A clash took place between him and the defender of Zobahan team in the penalty area. This player was influential in the rise of Esteghlal.

He left the team at the end of the 2018-2019 season and after two seasons in Esteghlal and playing 38 games.

Career statistics

Club

Honours
Sepahan
Persian Gulf Pro League (1) : 2014–15

Esteghlal
Hazfi Cup (1) : 2017–18

References
2. ارمین سهرابیان به استقلال پیوست   Armin Sohrabian joined Esteghlal www.tarafdari.com (in Persian).

3. آرمین سهرابیان به سایپا پیوست + عکس Armin Sohrabian joined Saipa tasnimnews.com (in Persian). 22 July 2019

4. سهرابیان: به استرا گفتند آرمین برود تا حاج صفی بیاید! www.varzesh3.com (in Persian). 15 July 2019

5. نقل و انتقالات/مدافع پیشین استقلال به سایپا پیوست medal1.com (in Persian).

6. مدافع مورد نظر استقلال شاگرد قلعه نویی شد www.khabarvarzeshi.com (in Persian). 27 September 2020

7. Saipa vs. Machine Sazi Soccerway. Retrieved 31 July 2020

8. Shahr Khodrou vs. Saipa Soccerway. Retrieved 11 July 2020

9. Esteghlal vs. Al Duhail Soccerway. Retrieved 6 May 2019

External links
• Armin Sohrabian at metafootball.com

• Armin Sohrabian at PersianLeague.com

•  Armin Sohrabian on Instagram

•  Armin Sohrabian at Soccerway

1995 births
Living people
Iranian footballers
Association football defenders
Sepahan S.C. footballers
Esteghlal F.C. players
People from Gorgan